Per Carlsen may refer to:

 Per Carlsén (born 1960), Swedish curler
 Per Carlsen (diplomat) (1948–2020), Danish diplomat, former Ambassador to Russia